The R399 road is a short regional road in Ireland linking the N55 to the R393; all in County Longford.

Its route runs north of the Royal Canal. Abbeyshrule, situated on the canal and Abbeyshrule airport are just off the R399 to the south.

See also
Roads in Ireland
National primary road
National secondary road

References
Roads Act 1993 (Classification of Regional Roads) Order 2006 – Department of Transport

Regional roads in the Republic of Ireland
Roads in County Longford